Codette is a village in the Canadian province of Saskatchewan within the Rural Municipality of Nipawin No. 487 and Census Division No. 14. The village is located 10 km south of Nipawin at the junction of Highway 35 and Highway 789.

History 
Codette incorporated as a village on March 9, 1929. The community shares its name with nearby Codette Lake, a man-made lake on the Saskatchewan River, blocked by the Francois Finlay Dam.

Demographics 

See also

 List of communities in Saskatchewan
 Villages of Saskatchewan

References

Villages in Saskatchewan
Nipawin No. 487, Saskatchewan
Division No. 14, Saskatchewan